The 2020 Texas Rangers season was the 60th of the Texas Rangers franchise overall, their 49th in Arlington as the Rangers, and the inaugural season at the newly constructed Globe Life Field.

On March 12, 2020, MLB announced that because of the ongoing COVID-19 pandemic, the start of the regular season would be delayed by at least two weeks in addition to the remainder of spring training being cancelled. Four days later, it was announced that the start of the season would be pushed back indefinitely due to the recommendation made by the CDC to restrict events of more than 50 people for eight weeks. On June 23, commissioner Rob Manfred unilaterally implemented a 60-game season. Players reported to training camps on July 1 in order to resume spring training and prepare for a July 24 Opening Day.

Spring training
Texas Ranger pitchers and catchers reported on February 11, 2020 to spring training in Surprise, Arizona, United States.

Regular season

Season standings

American League West

American League Wild Card

Record against opponents

Roster

Game log

|- style="background:#cfc;"
| 1 || July 24 || Rockies || 1–0 || Lynn (1–0) || Márquez (0–1) || Leclerc (1) || 1–0 || W1
|- style="background:#fbb;"
| 2 || July 25 || Rockies || 2–3 || Bard (1–0) || Minor (0–1) || Davis (1) || 1–1 || L1
|- style="background:#fbb;"
| 3 || July 26 || Rockies || 2–5 || Freeland (1–0) || Palumbo (0–1)|| Davis (2)  || 1–2 || L2
|- style="background:#fbb;"
| 4 || July 28 || Diamondbacks || 1–4 || Kelly (1–0) || Gibson (0–1) || Bradley (1) || 1–3 || L3
|- style="background:#cfc;"
| 5 || July 29 || Diamondbacks || 7–4 || Hernández (1–0) || Chafin (0–1) || Goody (1) || 2–3 || W1
|- style="background:#fbb;"
| 6 || July 31 || @ Giants || 2–9 || Menez (1–0) || Minor (0–2) || — || 2–4 || L1
|-

|- style="background:#fbb;"
| 7 || August 1 || @ Giants || 3–7 || Baragar (2–0) || Lyles (0–1) || — || 2–5 || L2
|- style="background:#cfc;"
| 8 || August 2 || @ Giants || 9–5 || Hernández (2–0) || Triggs (0–1) || — || 3–5 || W1
|- style="background:#fbb;"
| 9 || August 4 || @ Athletics || 1–5 || Hendriks (1–0) || Vólquez (0–1) || — || 3–6 || L1
|- style="background:#fbb;"
| 10 || August 5 || @ Athletics || 4–6 || McFarland (1–0) || Gibaut (0–1) || Soria (2) || 3–7 || L2
|- style="background:#fbb;"
| 11 || August 6 || @ Athletics || 4–6 || Fiers (1–0) || Minor (0–3) || Hendriks (4) || 3–8 || L3
|- style="background:#cfc;"
| 12 || August 7 || Angels || 4–3 || Lyles (1–1) || Canning (0–2) || Montero (1) || 4–8 || W1
|-style="background:#cfc;"
| 13 || August 8 || Angels || 2–0 || Vólquez (1–1) || Sandoval (0–1) || Montero (2) || 5–8 || W2
|- style="background:#cfc;"
| 14 || August 9 || Angels || 7–3 || Lynn (2–0) || Heaney (1–1) || — || 6–8 || W3  
|- style="background:#fbb;"
| 15 || August 10 || Mariners || 2–10 || Dunn (1–1) || Gibson (0–2) || — || 6–9 || L1 
|- style="background:#cfc;"
| 16 || August 11 || Mariners || 4–2 || Vólquez (2–1) || Gonzales (2–2) || Montero (3) || 7–9 || W1
|- style="background:#cfc;"
| 17 || August 12 || Mariners || 7–4 || Hernández (3–0) || Swanson (0–1) || Montero (4) || 8–9 || W2
|- style="background:#cfc;"
| 18 || August 14 || @ Rockies || 3–2 || Lynn (3–0) || Bard (1–1) || — || 9–9 || W3
|- style="background:#cfc;"
| 19 || August 15 || @ Rockies || 6–4 || Gibson (1–2) || Márquez (2–3) || Montero (5) || 10–9 || W4
|- style="background:#fbb;"
| 20 || August 16 || @ Rockies || 6–10 || Gray (1–2) || Allard (0–1) || Estévez (1) || 10–10 || L1
|- style="background:#fbb;"
| 21 || August 17 || Padres || 4–14 || Davies (3–2) || Lyles (1–2) || — || 10–11 || L2
|- style="background:#fbb;"
| 22 || August 18 || Padres || 4–6 || Stammen (2–1) || Minor (0–4) || Quantrill (1) || 10–12 || L3
|- style="background:#fbb;"
| 23 || August 19 || @ Padres || 3–6  || Hill (1–0) || Montero (0–1) || — || 10–13 || L4
|- style="background:#fbb;"
| 24 || August 20 || @ Padres || 7–8  || Johnson (2–1) || García (0–1) || — || 10–14 || L5
|- style="background:#fbb;"
| 25 || August 21 || @ Mariners || 4–7 || Margevicius (1–1) || Allard (0–2) || Williams (5) || 10–15 || L6
|- style="background:#fbb;"
| 26 || August 22 || @ Mariners || 1–10 || Sheffield (2–2) || Lyles (1–3) || — || 10–16 || L7
|- style="background:#fbb;"
| 27 || August 23 || @ Mariners || 1–4 || Dunn (2–1) || Minor (0–5) || Williams (6) || 10–17 || L8
|- style="background:#cfc;"
| 28 || August 24 || Athletics || 3–2 || Lynn (4–0) || Luzardo (2–1) || Montero (6) || 11–17 || W1
|- style="background:#fbb;"
| 29 || August 25 || Athletics || 3–10 || Manaea (2–2) || Gibson (1–3) || — || 11–18 || L1
|- style="background:#fbb;"
| 30 || August 26 || Athletics || 1–3 || Fiers (4–1) || Allard (0–3) || Hendriks (10) || 11–19 || L2
|- style="background:#bbb;"
| — || August 27 || Athletics || colspan=7 | Postponed (Strikes due to shooting of Jacob Blake); Makeup: September 12 
|- style="background:#cfc;"
| 31 || August 28 || Dodgers || 6–2 || Hernández (4–0) || McGee (2–1) || — || 12–19 || W1
|- style="background:#fbb;"
| 32 || August 29 || Dodgers || 4–7 || Treinen (3–1) || Lynn (4–1) || Jansen (9) || 12–20 || L1
|- style="background:#fbb;"
| 33 || August 30 || Dodgers || 2–7 || Alexander (2–0) || Gibson (1–4) || — || 12–21 || L2
|-

|- style="background:#cfc;"
| 34 || September 1 || @ Astros || 6–5  || Hernández (5–0) || Taylor (1–1) || Montero (7) || 13–21 || W1
|- style="background:#fbb;"
| 35 || September 2 || @ Astros || 1–2 || Javier (4–1) || Allard (0–4) || Pressly (7) || 13–22 || L1
|- style="background:#fbb;"
| 36 || September 3 || @ Astros || 4–8 || Greinke (3–0) || Lynn (4–2) || — || 13–23 || L2
|- style="background:#fbb;"
| 37 || September 4 || @ Mariners || 3–6 || Kikuchi (2–2) || Cody (0–1) || — || 13–24 || L3
|- style="background:#fbb;"
| 38 || September 5 || @ Mariners || 3–5 || Gerber (1–0) || Hernández (5–1) || Ramírez (2) || 13–25 || L4
|- style="background:#fbb;"
| 39 || September 6 || @ Mariners || 3–4 || Dunn (3–1) || Lyles (1–4) || Hirano (1) || 13–26 || L5
|- style="background:#fbb;"
| 40 || September 7 || @ Mariners || 4–8 || Gonzales (5–2) || Allard (0–5) || Ramírez (3) || 13–27 || L6
|- style="background:#cfc;"
| 41 || September 8 || Angels || 7–1 || Lynn (5–2) || Heaney (3–3) || — || 14–27 || W1
|- style="background:#cfc;"
| 42 || September 9 || Angels || 7–3 || King (1–0) || Teherán (0–3) || — || 15–27 || W2
|- style="background:#fbb;"
| 43 || September 10 || Angels || 2–6 || Bundy (5–2) || Gibson (1–5) || — || 15–28 || L1
|- style="background:#fbb;"
| 44 || September 11 || Athletics || 6–10 || Fiers (5–2) || García (0–2) || — || 15–29 || L2 
|- style="background:#cfc;" 
| 45 ||  September 12  || Athletics || 5–2  || Benjamin (1–0) || Jefferies (0–1) || Montero (8) || 16–29 || W1
|- style="background:#fbb;"
| 46 || September 12  || Athletics || 1–10  || Bassitt (4–2) || Allard (0–6) || — || 16–30 || L1
|- style="background:#cfc;" 
| 47 || September 13 || Athletics || 6–3 || Lynn (6–2) || Montas (3–4) || — || 17–30 || W1 
|- style="background:#fbb;"
| 48 || September 15 || @ Astros || 1–4 || Urquidy (1–1) || Goody (0–1) || Pressly (10) || 17–31 || L1
|- style="background:#cfc;" 
| 49 || September 16 || @ Astros || 1–0 || Gibson (2–5) || Pressly (1–3) || — || 18–31 || W1
|- style="background:#fbb;"
| 50 || September 17 || @ Astros || 1–2 || Valdez (4–3) || Lyles (1–5) || Raley (1) || 18–32 || L1
|- style="background:#fbb;"
| 51 || September 18 || @ Angels || 2–6 || Barría (1–0) || Benjamin (1–1) || — || 18–33 || L2
|- style="background:#fbb;"
| 52 || September 19 || @ Angels || 3–4 || Mayers (2–0) || Martin (0–1) || — || 18–34 || L3
|- style="background:#cfc;"
| 53 || September 20 || @ Angels || 7–2 || Cody (1–1) || Teherán (0–4) || — || 19–34 || W1
|- style="background:#fbb;"
| 54 || September 21 || @ Angels || 5–8 || Bundy (6–3) || Gibson (2–6) || Mayers (1) || 19–35 || L1
|- style="background:#fbb;"
| 55 || September 22 || @ Diamondbacks || 0–7 || Smith (2–0) || Lyles (1–6) || — || 19–36 || L2
|- style="background:#fbb;"
| 56 || September 23 || @ Diamondbacks || 3–7 || Mella (2–0) || Goody (0–2) || — || 19–37 || L3
|- style="background:#fbb;"
| 57 || September 24 || Astros || 4–12 || Javier (5–2) || Lynn (6–3) || — || 19–38 || L4
|- style="background:#cfc;"
| 58 || September 25 || Astros || 5–4  || Martin (1–1) || Paredes (3–3) || — || 20–38 || W1
|- style="background:#cfc;"
| 59 || September 26 || Astros || 6–1 || Herget (1–0) || Bielak (3–3) || — || 21–38 || W2
|- style="background:#cfc;"
| 60 || September 27 || Astros || 8–4 || Benjamin (2–1) || De Jong (0–1) || — || 22–38 || W3
|-

|- style="text-align:center;"
| Legend:       = Win       = Loss       = PostponementBold = Rangers team member

Farm system

References

External links
 2020 Texas Rangers season at Baseball-Reference.com
 2020 Texas Rangers fullseason schedule and
 Statistics  at MLB.com

Texas Rangers seasons
Texas Rangers
Texas Rangers